https://www.rts.rs/page/tv/sr/series/21/rts-2/434/emisije-o-filmu.html

Sandra Perović is a Serbian film critic and Radio Television Serbia journalist, TV author and editor.

Sandra Perović completed primary and secondary education in Belgrade. She graduated from The University of Belgrade Faculty of Law, and obtained a postgraduate degree in film sciences and electronic media at The University of Belgrade Faculty of Dramatic Arts. She holds a position of an editor in a Film and TV Series Redaction of Radio Television of Serbia, where she works as a journalist, film critic, author of specialized film programs – “The Big Illusion”, FEST Chronicles, Auteur Film Festival, documentary and shorts festivals. She is a reporter and author of film segments in a primetime news show on Radio Television Serbia,  ”Dnevik” and “Kulturi dnevnik”.
She has been leading the audience of the Public Media Service of Serbia through the world of motion pictures 25 year – from the most prestigious international film festivals, to the most important film events in the country and in our region. She executed more than 400 exclusive interviews with the most prominent figures in the world cinema – Oscar winners, movie stars and eminent directors such as Oliver Stone, Claude Chabrol, Taviani brothers, Ken Loach, David Lynch, Michael Caine, Anthony Hopkins, Leonardo Dicaprio, Sean Connery, Nicholas Cage, Matt Damon, James Franco, Ralph Fiennes, Sharon Stone, Clive Owen, Tilda Swinton, Julianne Moore, Pierce Brosnan, Steve Martin, Bruce Willis, Jean Reno, Daniel Craig, Christin Scott Thomas, Penelope Cruz, Natalie Portman, Jeremy Irons, Paul Verhoeven, Angelina Jolie, Jeff Bridges, Halle Berry, Antonio Banderas, Benicio del Toro, Juliette Binoche, Harvey Keitel, Colin Farrell, Isabel Huppert, Catherine Deneuve, Aleksandr Sokurov, Nikita Mihalkov, Andrei Konchalovsky, Andrzej Waida and many more. She promotes internationally local films and authors who represent Serbian culture in the best way. The exclusive is her challenge and driving force. Although she’s been working at RTS, where she learned the craft from the legends of this station, she is still full of beginner’s enthusiasm and professional satisfaction after a job well done. She was a board member at Film Center of Serbia, board member of FEST, and a member of Democratic party’s executive board. She is a jurist for The City of Belgrade Award in Film and Television, as well as a member of an international association of film critics FIPRESCI. She served in the critic’s jury at the most prestigious world festivals – Cannes, Venice and Berlin. She was awarded “Kapetan Miša Anastasijević Award” for “the beauty of expression and engaged reporting”.

Early life
Sandra Perović's father, Slavko, was a popular Yugoslavian singer.

References

Living people
Serbian women journalists
Year of birth missing (living people)
University of Belgrade alumni